Ibikpe is a village in Uruan local government area of Akwa Ibom state in Nigeria.

References 

Villages in Akwa Ibom